Swarm of the Snakehead is a 2006 comedy/horror feature film directed by Frank A. Lama and Joel C. Denning and written by Seth Hurwitz. It is the first feature from producers Lama and Hurwitz's Baltimore-based production company Ten Pound Films.

The ensemble cast includes Gunnar Hansen (The Texas Chain Saw Massacre), Rigg Kennedy (Slumber Party Massacre) and Miss Maryland Teen USA 2006 Jamie O'Brien.

Swarm of the Snakehead was shot on 16 mm film in and around Easton, Maryland between 2002 and 2005. Post-production was completed during the summer of 2006. A rough cut of the film was premiered for friends and family at The Charles Theatre in Baltimore (where John Waters premiered many of his early films) on June 21, 2006. The sold-out screening led to several articles in Maryland papers including The Baltimore Sun, as well as radio and television appearances. During one such appearance on the Baltimore CBS affiliate WJZ-TV, anchor and longtime Maryland personality Marty Bass called Swarm of the Snakehead "lots of fun" and "John Waters-esque."

While making Swarm of the Snakehead, Lama starred in Fear of Clowns released by Lions Gate Entertainment in 2005 and the upcoming Fear of Clowns 2, which he also produced. At the same time, Hurwitz edited Swarm and shepherded the film through post-production, working closely with sound designer Kevin Hill and composer Tom Alonso.

Cast
 Jamie O'Brien as Ashley Emerson
 Lisa Burdette as Mayor Janice Appleyard
 Maggie Denning as Margarita
 Timothy Stultz as Jake
 Johnny Alonso as Buddy Brown
 Gerry Paradiso as Jimmy
 Gunnar Hansen as Gunner
 Joel Denning as William Emerson
 Sharon Graves as Abigail Parker
 Rigg Kennedy as Dr. Emerson
 Frank Lama as Darrel Delhey
 Kim Mallory as Sandy Redhook
 Steve Carson as 'Meathead'
 Leanna Chamish as Briana Devine
 Lizzy Denning as Samantha 
 Bruce Geisert as Brown Johnson
 Erica Highberg as Mimi Mansfield
 Barry A. Hurwitz as Barry, The Diver
 Brandon Mason as Deputy Ricky
 The Mayo as 'Apocalypstick'
 George Stover as The Frenchman

Premise
A dysfunctional family vacations on the Maryland shore during a deadly attack of intelligent snakehead fish.

Soundtrack and music score 
The original score was composed and conducted by Tom Alonso and features players from the Baltimore Symphony Orchestra. Bands contributing songs to the soundtrack include Kip Winger, Ravyns, Bootcamp, Glen Nevous, Tony Sciuto of Little River Band, The Big Sky, and Dagmar and the Seductones.

External links 
 
 
 Review on Tierhorror.de
 Baltimore Sun interview with writer Seth Hurwitz
 June 15, 2006 Owings Mills Times article
 Horrortalk Review of Swarm of the Snakehead
 Cranked On Cinema Review of Swarm of the Snakehead
 Smash Or Trash Indie Filmmaking on Swarm of the Snakehead
 Swarm of the Snakehead Original Trailer
 Matte Painting VFX from Swarm of the Snakhead

2006 films
American comedy horror films
American teen comedy films
American teen horror films
2006 horror films
2006 comedy horror films
2006 comedy films
2000s English-language films
2000s American films